Antoine Claraz (8 September 1909, in Fribourg – 2 June 1997, in Fribourg), was a Swiss painter, sculptor and art teacher.

A selection of his work was exhibited in Musée d'art et d'histoire, Fribourg in 2000.

Works
Equestrian statue of Berthold IV, Duke of Zähringen, 1965, at Fribourg.

References

External links

1909 births
1997 deaths
20th-century Swiss sculptors
People from Fribourg
20th-century Swiss male artists